Elissa Alarie (born 31 January 1986) is a Canadian rugby union player. She represented  at the 2014 Women's Rugby World Cup.

Rugby career

Sevens career 
In 2013, she was included in the Canada's sevens teams to the 2013 Hong Kong Sevens and 2013 China Women's Sevens. The latter was the third leg of 2012–13 IRB Women's Sevens World Series. In 2016, she was also chosen for Canada's first women's rugby sevens Olympic Team.

In June 2021, Alarie was selected for Canada's 2020 Summer Olympics team. She is openly lesbian.

Rugby Fifteens career 
Alarie was named in Canada's squad to the 2021 Rugby World Cup in New Zealand.

References

1986 births
Living people
Canadian female rugby union players
Canada women's international rugby union players
Female rugby sevens players
Sportspeople from Trois-Rivières
Rugby sevens players at the 2020 Summer Olympics
Olympic rugby sevens players of Canada
Canada international women's rugby sevens players

Canadian LGBT sportspeople